Samuel Henry Harris (22 August 1881 – 25 December 1936) was an Australian surgeon who developed a new technique for prostatectomy.

Biography
Harry Harris (as he was usually known) was born in Sydney, the second son of Henry S. Harris and his wife Hannah, née Solomon. Harris was educated at Sydney Grammar School of which he was captain in 1900. He graduated M.B., Ch.M. (with credit) at the University of Sydney in 1906, where he also obtained his blue for cricket. After spending 1906–07 as resident medical officer at Sydney hospital, Harris had a general practice at Enmore and, becoming a consultant in 1918, was associated with the South Sydney Women's Hospital and was on the honorary medical staff of Lewisham hospital. He had obtained the degree of M.D. in 1914 with a thesis on the pyelonephritis of pregnancy.

Harris had been much interested in gynaecology, but now began to make a special study of urology. At a meeting of the Australasian medical congress held in Dunedin, New Zealand, in March 1927 he read a paper in which he described a new method of prostatectomy. It was at first condemned in England, but gradually gained favour in Australia, and in 1935 Harris visited Europe determined to demonstrate the advantages of his method. He made many converts, though a writer in The Lancet of 13 February 1937 would not say more than that "the majority of British genito-urinary surgeons are now prepared to admit that although his technique is unlikely ever to be used as a routine, it has gained an important place in prostatic surgery". Another original piece of work was his fluoroscopic study of neuro-muscular disturbances of the kidneys. He was the author of over 40 papers, many of which appeared in the Medical Journal of Australia, the Lancet, and other overseas journals, and was a member of the editorial committee of the Australian and New Zealand Journal of Surgery and of the British Journal of Surgery. He was always glad to communicate his knowledge and demonstrate his methods to other members of his profession, and surgeons from all parts of Australia and New Zealand came to him at Lewisham hospital. He had a brilliant and original mind, and was one of the few Australian surgeons to gain an international reputation. Harris died at Sydney on 25 December 1936 leaving a widow and one son.

References
Leonard J. T. Murphy, 'Harris, Samuel Henry (Harry) (1881 - 1936)', Australian Dictionary of Biography, Vol. 9, MUP, 1983, pp 212–213. Retrieved 21 January 2009

1881 births
1936 deaths
Australian surgeons
Medical doctors from Sydney
20th-century surgeons